Royal Military College (abbreviated RMC) is an all-boys military school established to train young Malaysians for service in the Malaysian Armed Forces (MAF). RMC is an elite and prestigious College in Malaysia. It is sometimes dubbed "the Malaya's Sandhurst". On 9 December 1966, in a ceremony held at the college, HM Ismail Nasiruddin of Terengganu, the Yang Di-Pertuan Agong, conferred the "Royal"  (Malay: DiRaja) title to the FMC. This was a great honour for the college as RMC the only educational institution in the history of this nation has the "Royal" title bestowed upon it. Hence since 1966, the former Federation Military College came to be known as the Royal Military College.

A current student of RMC is known as a Present Putera, while a graduate of the institution is known as an Old Putera or "OP" in short. The term Putera, literally meaning prince in Malay, is attributed to the RMC's royal status. As of 3 July 2015 (in conjunction with its anniversary), RMC has received authorisation to become an IB World School and implement the International Baccalaureate Diploma Program (IBDP).

Location 
The RMC campus covers an area of  near the town of Sungai Besi (about 10 miles (16 km) from Kuala Lumpur) with a view of the Mines Resort City and the 1998 Commonwealth Games Bukit Jalil Stadium. RMC shares its grounds with the National Defence University of Malaysia.

Charter
The Charter of the Royal Military College states that the Royal Military College was established with the objective of preparing young Malaysians to become Officers in the Malaysian Armed Forces, hold office in the higher divisions of public service and become leaders in the professional, commercial and industrial life of the country.

The motto of the college is "Serve to Lead" or Berkhidmat Memimpin.

History
Prior to 1952, there had been what was called the "Training Depot of the Malay Regiment" in Port Dickson. Here courses were held in signals, tactics and military administration. The Depot also provide educational facilities to bring selected members of the Regiment up to the necessary academic standard for acceptance at the Royal Military Academy, Sandhurst, for higher military training, with a view to qualifying for commissioned rank.

On 3 July 1952, Mr. M.E.B. David, the Secretary of Defence, in the Federal Legislative Council Meeting, announced the decision to expand the Malay Regiment Training Depot. The expansion was to result in the formation of The Malay Regiment Training Center, that was to constitute two additional sections: The Pre-Officer Cadet Training Unit (Pre-OCTU) and an inter-racial Boys Company.

The Boys Company was to be part of the Malayan Army, serving the Malay Regiment and the Federation Regiment. The function of the Boys Company was to provide education to sons of serving officers and other ranks in the Malay Regiment, leading to the School Certificate level, coupled with the rudiments of military training.

The first intake of 74 Boys into the Boys Company were recruited in August 1952, from a total of 100 applicants. The ages of the Boys ranged between 14 and 15 years. Their educational qualification, according to a 1952 newspaper bulletin, was to be the equivalent of Standard 4 (English-medium). In addition to these academic requirements those who were shortlisted had to undergo various aptitude tests too.

The task of looking after the academic aspects in the Boys Wing was entrusted to a Director of Studies (DOS) – a civilian Senior Education Officer. He was responsible to the Commandant for carrying out the scholastic policy drawn by the Board of Governors of the College and thus adviser to the Commandant on general educational policies. The DOS had two Senior-Assistants each responsible for the teaching of a group of subjects – called the Head of Science and Mathematics (HOS) and Head of Arts (HOA).

For the purpose of military training, and the co-ordination of domestics military administration required within the Boys Wing, an Officer-in-Charge (O.C.) (later to be known as Chief Instructor - CI) was posted. He was responsible to the Director of Studies (DOS) and thus ultimately to the Commandant.

In September 1954, the Commemoration Foundation Day was celebrated marking the 2nd anniversary of the Boys Company. Present to witness the Commemoration Day Parade were the High Commissioner, Sir Donald MacGillivray, His Highness, the Sultan of Selangor, the Yang di-Pertuan Besar of Negeri Sembilan, the Federation's Prime Minister Tunku Abdul Rahman, Deputy Prime Minister Tun Abdul Razak and a large number of dignitaries. 

By September 1957, the Boys Company of the Malay Regiment had become officially part of independent Malaya and had already graduated a number of young boys preparing for service in the Army, the private sector and public service.

Independence period 
The entire project, expected to be completed by 1963, was financed by the British Government under the United Kingdom Grants-in-aid Funds.

The site reserved for the College consisted of scenic surroundings. The new home of the FMC was situated on a hill overlooking a disused mining pool. The College buildings were to be modelled on the lines of some of the best military academies overseas such as West Point in the United States and Royal Military College of Canada. They were to consist of an assembly hall, dormitories, classrooms, a gymnasium, laboratories, some 140 married-quarters for all ranks and civilians employees and a sports complex area with playing grounds and facilities for student athletes.

On 20 June 1961, the then Yang di-Pertuan Agong, Putra of Perlis, as Supreme Commander of the Malayan Armed Forces, officially opened the new complex. In acknowledgement of the immense debt of which the FMC owed the High Commissioner Field Marshal Tun Sir Gerald Templer, the Assembly Hall was named Tun Templer Hall (Dewan Tun Templer).

On 9 December 1966, in a ceremony held at the college, HM Ismail Nasiruddin of Terengganu, the Yang Di-Pertuan Agong, conferred the "Royal" title to the FMC. This was a great honour for the college for no other educational institution in the history of this nation has the "Royal" title bestowed upon it. Hence since 1966, the former Federation Military College came to be known as the Royal Military College of Malaysia.

On 3 June 1981, the Royal Military College was granted King's and Regimental's Colours from His Majesty Seri Paduka Baginda Yang DiPertuan Agong, Tuanku Haji Ahmad Shah Ibni Al-Marhum Sultan Abu Bakar, in a historic Presentation of Colours ceremony at the Merdeka Stadium, Kuala Lumpur. This historic ceremony was also witnessed by Her Majesty the Raja Permaisuri Agong, the Prime Minister, YAB Dato Hussein Onn and Datin Suhaila, the Deputy Prime Minister, YAB Dato Seri Dr. Mahathir Mohamad and Datin Dr. Siti Hasmah.

College anthem
The college anthem is entitled Berkhidmat Memimpin (Serve to Lead) which refers to the college motto. The college song is sung during all assemblies.

Sports
The college has won numerous awards and accolades at all levels of competition and at various sports, most significantly in rugby and hockey. The college also fields a formidable English Debate team that has won the prestigious Prime Minister's Trophy a record number of times, only to be equalled by its arch-rival on the debating stage, the Tunku Kurshiah College. The College also organises an annual multi-game carnival with its other arch-rival, the Malay College Kuala Kangsar. Both colleges take turns to host the competition.

Within the College, each Putera belongs to one of eight Companies. They are:

The eight companies compete with each other for four trophies:
 Piala Ali (academic)
 Piala Murad (military)
 Piala Halim (field sports)
 Piala Razak (other sports).

The overall winner is presented the Commandant's Trophy, which is awarded to the winning company at the Annual Passing-out Parade, usually inspected by the defence minister of Malaysia. The victorious company will hold the title of Commandant Company, and all the Puteras of that company shall be entitled to wear a royal yellow lanyard cord on their right shoulder during the Passing-out Parade and for the rest of the academic year.

Sportsman's Prayer 
The Sportsman's Prayer is inscribed on a bronze plaque, on a white rock that sits by the rugby field in the college compound.

The Sportsman's Prayer is traditionally recited before a sporting competition by the members of a team. The prayer is as follows:
Oh God, please help me to win for I always want to win. But if in thy inscrutable wisdom Thou willest me not to win, then make me a good loser. For when the one great scorer comes to write against your name, he writes not that you won or lost, but how you played the game.

Organisation and rank
All Companies have four senior rankholders and five junior rankholders.

Every Company is led by one Senior Under Officer (SUO) and assisted by three Junior Under Officers (JUOs), who are fourth year Puteras appointed by the College administration. The terms SUO and JUO are a throwback to the traditions of the Royal Military Academy at Sandhurst, where such titles are still in use today for senior rankholders. Fourth year Puteras who are not rankholders are entitled to be referred to as Senior Puteras (SP).

The SUO is responsible for all aspects of the Puteras under his command, and is the highest ranking Putera in the Company. The three JUOs, covering the General, Administration and Quartering billets of the Company, are equal in terms of rank and assist the SUO in the running of the Company on a day-to-day basis. All Under Officers are entitled to a private bunk each, and SUO's are also entitled to have their meals at the High Table in the Mess Hall. SUO's also carry swagger stick and don Sam Browne belt during official parade (except Passing Out Parade).

SUO's lead their Company at all Parades and are the main liaisons between the military administration and the Puteras under his care. SUOs and JUOs are also subject to the authority of the Company's commissioned officers and instructors, and play a role in the selection of junior rankholders.

Rank is denoted by slip-on shoulder epaulettes and is worn on all uniforms except the Mosque Order (traditional Malay dress) and the Planters' Order (formal blazer and College tie dress). Prior to 1997, these slip-on epaulettes were only worn by the senior and junior rankholders, and its use was accompanied by a metallic shoulder title, bearing the name Maktab Tentera Diraja underneath the rank insignia on the epaulette.

In 1997, this rank insignia structure was amended to bring it in line with the Officer Cadet rank insignia in use at the Army College (KTD, Kolej Tentera Darat) and the then-newly established Malaysian Armed Forces Academy (ATMA, Akademi Angkatan Tentera Malaysia). The main difference between an Officer Cadet rank insignia and the Putera rank insignia is the color of the insignia; the bars, knots and chevrons on an Officer Cadet rank are white in color, while the same on a Putera rank is royal yellow in color.

An SUO's rank insignia consists of four horizontal bars (one bar for each year of study at the College) with an Austrian knot and chevron pointing upwards underneath the knot, on a dark green epaulette.

A JUO's rank insignia is identical to the SUO's, except that there is no chevron underneath the Austrian knot.

The letters MTD (acronym of the College's Malay name, Maktab Tentera Diraja) are also emblazoned in royal yellow at the bottom edge of the epaulette for both ranks.

Junior rankholders on the other hand are understudies for the senior rankholder posts and are invested with similar authority with senior rankholders. Nevertheless, all actions of junior rankholders are subject to review by the senior rankholders and the College administration.

Putera Sergeants (P/SGT) are normally appointed from the third year Puteras in the first quarter of the academic year, and they are further promoted to Acting Senior Under Officer (A/SUO) and Acting Junior Under Officer (A/JUO) ranks by the third quarter of the academic year to allow for the gradual takeover of the Company from the graduating seniors.

A P/SGT's rank insignia consists of three horizontal bars and three chevrons pointing downwards. An A/SUO's rank insignia consists of three horizontal bars and a bright red Austrian knot and chevron pointing upwards underneath the knot. An A/JUO's rank insignia is identical to the A/SUO's, except that there is no chevron underneath the Austrian knot. The letters MTD (acronym of the College's Malay name, Maktab Tentera Diraja) are in royal yellow at the bottom edge of the epaulette for all three ranks.

P/SGTs, A/SUOs and A/JUOs are not entitled to any privileges accorded to the senior rankholders.

As of 2009, new epaulette were introduced for the Puteras following the changes in intakes from Form 2 to Form 4 in the year 2006. The first year Puteras (or New boys) initially wears a pair of epaulettes having only one yellow horizontal bar above the MTD acronym. Later on, some of the Puteras who are promoted to A.P/SGT wears a pair of epaulettes consists of one red horizontal bar above the MTD acronym and three red chevrons pointing downwards. The A.P/SGT are the Puteras that will take up the senior ranks of the Company in the following year.

As of 2014, two new ranks were formed; Putera Commander (P/CO) and Putera Regimental Sergeant Major (P/RSM). After the selection of rank holders at the beginning of each year, they will be given a 3-month probationary period. In the month of April, one SUO will be promoted to P/CO and one P/SGT will be promoted to P/RSM.

As of 2020, one SP will be promoted to the rank of President of the Mess Committee (PMC). The newly promoted PMC will wear a pair of epaulettes having two yellow horizontal bars with a yellow Austrian knot and the letters PMC beneath it, to distinguish him from a JUO. The PMC bears responsibility and holds the highest authority for any matter regarding the Putera's Mess. Therefore entitling him to have his meals along with other SUOs at the High Table in the Mess Hall.

Traditions and practices

Normally, after their Passing Out Parade, OPs will get their class ring (or also known as OP ring) as a sign that they have graduated from the college and to commemorate their time in the college. The tradition was influenced by the similar tradition practised by Royal Military Academy Sandhurst which was introduced by British administrators during the college's early days.

Furthermore, OPs wear their college's green tie every Wednesday. This makes it easier for OPs to recognize each other, regardless of generations, race and religion.

Notable alumni
The alumni association of the RMC is known as the Old Putera Association or OPA.

Some alumnis include:

Military 
General (Rtd) Tan Sri Md Hashim Hussein, Chief of the Malaysian Army (1999-2002), Malaysian High Commissioner to Pakistan.
General (Rtd) Tan Sri Abd Rahman Abd Hamid, Chief of Defence Force (1993-1994).
General (Rtd) Tan Sri Borhan Ahmad, Chief of Defence Force (1994-1995).
General (Rtd) Tan Sri Ismail Omar, Chief of Defence Force (1995-1998).
General (Rtd) Tan Sri Mohd Zahidi Hj Zainuddin, Chief of Defence Force (1999-2005).
General (Rtd) Tan Sri Abd Aziz Zainal, Chief of Defence Force (2007-2009).
Lieutenant General (Rtd) Winston Choo, Chief of Defence Force (Singapore) (1974-1992), Singapore's Non-Resident Ambassador to Israel.
Major General (Rtd) Sulaiman Damit, Commander of the Royal Brunei Armed Forces (1990-1994).

Politician/Government Servants 
 Syed Saddiq Syed Abdul Rahman, former Minister for Youth and Sports, Member of Parliament of Muar.
 Mohamad Ariff Md Yusof, former Speaker of the Parliament.
 Mohd Rashid Hasnon, Member of Parliament of Batu Pahat, Deputy Speaker of the Parliament and former Deputy Chief Minister 1 of Penang
 Ling Liong Sik, former president of the Malaysian Chinese Association, and former Minister.
 Raja Nong Chik Zainal Abidin, former Minister and Member of Parliament.
 Annuar Musa, Minister of Communications and Multimedia, Member of Parliament of Ketereh.
 Mohd Radzi Sheikh Ahmad, former Minister, Member of Parliament and national footballer.
 Mohd Radzi Md Jidin, Senator, Senior Minister in charge of Education and Minister of Education.
 Md. Alwi Che Ahmad, State Assemblyman for Kok Lanas, Kelantan.
 Dr Idris Ahmad, State Assemblyman for Ijok, Selangor.
 Onn Hafiz Ghazi, Menteri Besar Johor, State Assemblyman for Machap, Johor.
 Mohd Radzi, former Minister of Home.
 Zulkefli Ahmad Makinuddin, former President of the Court of Appeal.
 Samsudin Osman, civil servant and former Chief Secretary to the Government.
 Abdul Halim Ali, Civil servant and former Chief Secretary to the Government.

Corporate Leaders 
G. Gnanalingam, businessman and chairman of Westports Malaysia Sdn Bhd
Mohd Nor bin Yusof - former CEO of Malaysia Airlines
Ng Keng Hooi - CEO and President of AIA
Zainal Abidin Abd Rashid, former CEO Income Tax Board
Munir bin Abd Majid - Economist, Former Executive Chairman, Securities Commission
Rizal Naizali, former Ceo of Perak FC
Rafiq Khan Akbar, CEO/MD of ALAM
Md. Alwi Che Ahmad, Chairman Malaysia Digital Economy Corporation (MDEC)
Tan Sri Ir. Kunasingam A/L V.Sittampalam, first Malaysian International Fellow of Royal Academy of Engineering UK

Royalty 

Tengku Sarafudin Badlishah, current Raja Muda (Crown Prince) of Kedah

Celebrity 
AC Mizal, actor, singer, comedian and TV host
Ashraf Muslim, actor, TV host, producer and medical practitioner

Sports 

Mirnawan Nawawi, former national hockey player, Malaysia Flag Bearer (Olympic Sydney, 2000)
Shahrudin Mohamed Ali, former Malaysian 100 metres sprint, Malaysia Flag Bearer (Olympic Rome, 1960)
Khairul Anuar Jailani, former national basketball player and founder of National Community Basketball League
Mohd Radzi Sheikh Ahmad, former Minister, Member of Parliament and national footballer.

Others 

Jomo Kwame Sundaram, Economist
Muhammad Shafee Abdullah - Lawyer
Samuel Ong, cardiologist (Commandant's Prize winner, 1971)
Ahmad Ammar Ahmad Azam, Islamic activist and recipient of the 1435H/2014 Maulidurrasul Figure Awards
Abd Manaf Kasmuri, recipient UN Medal
Ramli Bin Ibrahim, Choreographer

PGB & SP Medal Recipients
Major Zainal Abd Rashid SP, Company Alpha leader of 17th RAMD 
Lt Col (retired) Robert Rizal Abdullah PGB,3rd Royal Ranger Regiment
Lt Col (retired) Basri Haji Omar, Rejimen Askar Jurutera DiRaja

Past Commandants
1953–1955: Lt. Col. J Mahoney OBE MC
1956–1958: Lt. Col. P A C Don DSO
1959–1961: Lt. Col. R DE L King
1962–1964: Lt. Col. JW Pearson
1965–1967: Lt. Col. DW Grove DSO
1967–1968: Col. Abdul Jamil Bin Ahmad jssc psc
1969–1970: Col. Jaafar Bin Dato Onn SMK KMN psc
1971–1972: Col. Syed Hamzah Bin Syed Abu Bakar JSD KMN PJK psc
1973–1974: Col. Baharuddin Bin Mohd Diah
1974–1977: Col. Nik Mahmood Fakharuddin Bin Tan Sri Nik Ahmad Kamil PSK KMN psc
1978–1980: Col. Murad Bin Haji Jaafar KMN AMP PIS BE(UM) MEIM Eng jssc psc
1981–1983: Col. Mohamad Bin Munip SMK MIprod E AMIAME psc
1983–1985: Col. Aboo Samah Bin Aboo Bakar KMN Dip. Pol MBIM AMITD psc
1985–1990: Col. Abdul Ghani Bin Yunus PAT AMN MA psc
1990–1993: Col. Hussin Bin Haji Yusoff AMT AMK PIS PJK MA psc
1993–1995: Col. Haji Yusop Bin Haji Hussin KAT AMN PMC PJK BSoc Sc (Hons) M Ec psc
1995–1996: Col. Ramli Bin Haji Nik DNS AMT PMC MA (Lancs) PAT psc te
Sept 1996 – Oct 1996: Col. Khalid Bin Saad AMN PJK MSM (US) mpat psc
1996–1999: Col.Ahmad Rodi Bin Zakaria PAT KAT AMN PNBB mpat psc
1999–2000: Lt. Col. Ahmad Ghazali Bin Abu Hassan AMN LLM (Lancs) psc
2000–2002: Col. Mohd Razif Bin Hj Idris ADK KAT ACM DBS (Mktg) DIM (UKM) mpat psc (Phil)
2002 – 2004: Col. Azizan Bin Md Delin KMN AMK AAP MA (NPS) LL.B (Hons) psc
2004–2006: Col Mohd Shukri bin Ahmad PAT SDK KMN BCK psc 't' MDA (Cranfield) GCGI (London)
2006–2007: Kept Syed Shahirudin Putra bin Syed Osman TLDM PAT PCM KAT KMN PPS PPA MMgt HRM (UNSW) PG Dip EBM (UTM) MMIHRM psc
2007–2010: Kept Alias bin Baharuddin TLDM PAT KAT KMN PPS PPA Msc (Mngt) Adv Dip (Mngt)
2010–2011: Col Zakaria Yadi PAT SMP KAT KMN PNBB (Somalia) MSc (USNPS) LLM (Malaya) LLB (Hons) UiTM DSDC lmt 
2011–2012: Col Amirrudin Bin Dato Sulaiman KAT AMN PJM PNBB (Cambodia) MDef Studies (Canberra) MA (UKM) BA (Hons) (UK) mpat psc
2012–2016: Col Wan Ghazali bin Wan Din PAT SDK KAT KMN PPS LLB (hons) (UiTM) LLM (Malaya) MA (UKM) mpat lmt
2016–2017: Col Noorrul Azril Bin Ariffin PAT KAT KMN AMK MM (AIM) Manila Msoc Sc Def Studies (UKM) mpat psc
2017 – 2018 : Brig Gen Hj Mohd Shahada bin Ismail RMAF
2018–2020 : Brig Gen Abdul Halim bin Abu Hassan RMAF
2020–present : Brig Gen Mohd Shaifuddin bin Mohd Shariff RMAF

See also
Military of Malaysia
Malaysian Army
National Defence University of Malaysia

References

External links

Old Putera Association
OP Online forum (as of 7 May 2010)

Educational institutions established in 1952
1952 establishments in Malaya
Boarding schools in Malaysia
Secondary schools in Malaysia
Publicly funded schools in Malaysia
Military schools in Malaysia
Boys' schools in Malaysia
International Baccalaureate schools in Malaysia